Capital is a  department of Mendoza Province in Argentina.

Sports
Mendoza is home to several football clubs, the most notable of these is Gimnasia y Esgrima who play in the regionalised 3rd Division.
The most notable football team of the moment is Club Atletico Godoy Cruz Antonio Tomba, which participates in the first division of Argentinian Football. Club Sportivo Independiente Rivadavia is also a very well known football team, it's disputing the Nacional B tournament which is second division in Argentina.

Education
The main campus of the National University of Cuyo is based in Mendoza City. UTN (Universidad Tecnologica Nacional) is also situated in Mendoza City.

Districts

The Department was divided in seven districts: 

Primera Sección

Segunda Sección

Tercera Sección

Cuarta Sección

Quinta Sección

Sexta Sección

Zona Oeste

But since January 2003 is divided in twelve districts, remaining the sections 1 to 5 their limits: 

Primera Sección

Segunda Sección

Tercera Sección

Cuarta Sección

Quinta Sección

Sexta Sección

Séptima Sección

Octava Sección

Novena Sección

Décima Sección

Décimoprimera Sección

Décimosegunda Sección

External links
 (Spanish)
National University of Cuyo (Spanish)

1869 establishments in Argentina
Departments of Mendoza Province
Mendoza, Argentina